Keep Indy Indie is the slogan used by the small business community of Indianapolis, Indiana. It is a spinoff of Keep Austin Weird. Keep Indy Indie is also the namesake of a blog about the emerging independent business and art scene in Indianapolis.

See also

 Keep Portland Weird
 Keep Louisville Weird

References

Slogans
Economy of Indianapolis
Culture of Indianapolis